Elize Kotzé is the current head coach of the South Africa national netball team, taking over in 2011. Her first major tournaments as national coach have been the 2011 World Netball Championships in Singapore and the 2011 World Netball Series in Liverpool.

References

External links
 World Netball Championships 2011 website. Retrieved 2011-11-29.
 Kotze makes four changes, SuperSport.com website. Retrieved 2011-11-30.
 SA netball coach satisfied, Sport24 website. Retrieved 2011-11-30.

Netball coaches
South African sports coaches
South African netball players

Living people
Year of birth missing (living people)
1995 World Netball Championships players